The 2003 All-Ireland Senior Football Championship was the 117th staging of the All-Ireland Senior Football Championship, the Gaelic Athletic Association's premier inter-county Gaelic football tournament. The championship began on 4 May 2003 and ended on 28 September 2003.

Armagh entered the championship as the defending champions.

On 28 September 2003, Tyrone won the championship following a 0-12 to 0-9 defeat of Armagh in the All-Ireland final. This was their first All-Ireland title.

Tyrone's Peter Canavan was the championship's top scorer with 1-48. Armagh forward Steven McDonnell was the choice for the Vodafone Footballer of the Year award.

Format
The provincial championships in Munster, Leinster, Ulster and Connacht were run as usual on a "knock-out" basis.  These provincial games were then followed by the "Qualifier" system:
Round 1 of the qualifiers included all the counties (except New York) that did not qualify for the Provincial Semi-finals. An open draw was made to give eight pairings.
Round 2 consisted of the eight defeated teams in the Provincial Semi-finals playing against the eight winners from Round 1. A draw was made to determine the eight pairings.
Round 3 consisted of the eight winners from Round 2. Another open draw was made to determine the four pairings.
Round 4 consisted of the four winners from Round 3 playing against the beaten Provincial finalists. A draw was made to determine the pairings.

The All-Ireland Quarter-finals: Each of the four Provincial Champions played one of the four winners from Round 4. The All-Ireland Semi-finals were played on a Provincial rota basis, initially determined by the Central Council. If a Provincial Championship winning team was defeated in its Quarter-final, the team that defeated it took its place in the Semi-final.

Provincial championships

Connacht Senior Football Championship

Quarter-finals

Semi-finals

Final

Munster Senior Football Championship

Quarter-finals

Semi-final

Final

Ulster Senior Football Championship

Preliminary round

Quarter-finals

Semi-finals

Finals

Leinster Senior Football Championship

First round

Quarter-finals

Semi-finals

Final

Qualifiers

Round 1

Round 2

Round 3

Round 4

All-Ireland
The provincial champions and the winners of round 4 contested the quarter finals. The quarter final matches would be between a provincial champion and a round 4 winner.

Quarter-finals

Semi-finals

Final

Championship statistics

Top scorers

Overall

Single game

Miscellaneous

 Limerick beat Cork for the first time since 1965.
 The first Munster championship meeting between Limerick and Clare since 1988.
 Laois won their first Leinster title in 57 years for the first time since 1981 neither Dublin or Meath reached the Leinster final.
 Tyrone won their first All Ireland title marketing a historic 6th breakthrough of Ulster counties hitting the "Roll of Honor" after Cavan 1933, 1935, 1947, 1948, 1952 , Down 1960, 1961, 1968, 1991, 1994 Donegal in 1992, Derry in 1993 & Armagh in 2002 
 The old system would have seen a Galway vs Laois All Ireland semi-final.

References